Dindicodes albodavidaria is a moth of the family Geometridae first described by Xue in 1992. It is found in China.

References

Moths described in 1992
Pseudoterpnini